Superficial deposits (or surficial deposits) refer to geological deposits typically of Quaternary age (less than 2.6 million years old). These geologically recent unconsolidated sediments may include stream channel and floodplain deposits, beach sands, talus gravels and glacial drift and moraine.  All pre-Quaternary deposits are referred to as bedrock.

Types and history
There are several types of superficial deposit, including raised beaches and brickearth. These were formed in periods of climate change during the ice ages.  The raised beaches were generally formed during periods of higher sea level, when ice sheets were at a minimum, and the sand and shingle deposits can be seen in many low cliffs. The brickearth is originally a wind-blown dust deposited under extremely cold, dry conditions but much has been re-deposited by flood water and mixed with flints.

Superficial deposits were originally recorded only onshore and around the coast where they were laid down by various natural processes such as action by ice, water and wind. More recently offshore deposits have been mapped and may be separate sea-bed sediments.

Most of these superficial deposits are unconsolidated sediments such as gravel, sand, silt and clay, and onshore they form relatively thin, often discontinuous patches. Almost all of these deposits were formerly classified on the basis of mode of origin with names such as, 'glacial deposits', 'river terrace deposits' or 'blown sand'; or on their composition such as 'peat'.

Swedish databases
Sweden's Quaternary geology databases contain information on the properties of superficial deposits. This information, particularly at a scale of 1:50000, can be used for a number of different purposes in farming and forestry, including avoiding erosion, assessing growing conditions, gauging risks in terms of nutrient leaching and release of toxic substances, planning site preparation, road construction, felling and extraction operations, judging accessibility etc.

See also

References

Sedimentary rocks
Sediments